Cascabela is a genus of flowering plants in the dogbane family, Apocynaceae. It is native to Mexico, Central America, and South America.

Species
 Cascabela gaumeri (Hemsl.) Lippold - Veracruz, Tabasco, Yucatán Peninsula, Belize, Guatemala, Honduras, Nicaragua, Costa Rica
 Cascabela ovata (Cav.) Lippold - Central America, much of Mexico
 Cascabela pinifolia (Standl. & Steyerm.) L.O.Alvarado & Ochot.-Booth - C + S Mexico
 Cascabela thevetia (L.) Lippold  - Latin America from N Mexico to NE Argentina
 Cascabela thevetioides (Kunth) Lippold - Mexico

References

 
Apocynaceae genera
Taxa named by Constantine Samuel Rafinesque